Events from the year 1606 in Ireland.

Incumbent
Monarch: James I

Events
Plantation of Ulster: substantial lowland Scots settlement on disinhabited land in north Down, led by Hugh Montgomery and James Hamilton.
County Wicklow becomes the last of the traditional counties of Ireland to be shired, from land previously part of counties Dublin and Carlow.
Donal of the Pipes, 13th Prince of Carbery, chooses to surrender and regrant his barony to the Crown of England.
Anglican churchman William Bedell translates the Book of Common Prayer into Irish.

Births
June 16 – Arthur Chichester, 1st Earl of Donegall, soldier (d. 1675)
October – Hugh O'Donnell, 2nd Earl of Tyrconnell, soldier (d. 1642)
approximate date – Claud Hamilton, 2nd Baron Hamilton of Strabane, nobleman (d. 1638)

Deaths
February 21 – Richard Field, superior of the Irish Jesuit mission (b. c.1554)
Sir Edmund Pelham, judge (b. c.1533)

References

 
1600s in Ireland
Ireland
Years of the 17th century in Ireland